Mille Plateaux is a German record label founded in 1994 by Achim Szepanski in Frankfurt, as a sublabel of Force Inc. Music Works. Its releases in the fields of minimal techno, glitch music and other experimental electronic music have a lasting influence.

History

Origins and Activities (1994-2004) 
The name Mille Plateaux was taken from Mille Plateaux (A Thousand Plateaus), a philosophy book by Gilles Deleuze and Félix Guattari, published in 1980. Their idea of the rhizome has been applied as the label's concept of publishing a large variety of forward thinking electronic music from different contexts.

In 2000, Mille Plateaux released their Clicks & Cuts Series, which featured both Mille Plateaux and non-Mille Plateaux glitch music artists. This series is widely perceived to be a cornerstone of glitch music.

Bankruptcy and Various Revivals (2004-2011) 
In early 2004, Mille Plateaux's parent company Force Inc. went bankrupt due to the collapse of Germany's main independent music distributor, EFA-Medien. Mille Plateaux and other Force Inc. Music Works owned labels also folded at that time. The label was revived briefly in late 2004 under the name MillePlateauxMedia, with 4 releases. In 2005, two releases were made by RAI STREUBEL MUSIC S.L. on the label Supralinear with the note "by Mille Plateaux". In 2006, Mille Plateaux (along with the other former Force Inc. Music Works labels Force Inc. and Force Tracks) was taken over by the Berlin-based company Disco Inc. Ltd., who only released two CD albums.

In March 2008, Mille Plateaux was acquired by Total Recall, an online store and distributor for used and new music. Their owner Marcus Gabler, known as singer of the band Okay, became the A&R manager. Mille Plateaux relaunched its activities on 7 May 2010, with three new albums but halted activity in 2011. In 2018, Total Recall was dissolved.

Relaunch by Achim Szepanski (2018-present) 
Its original founder Achim Szepanski successfully reactivated the label's activity in 2018. Since then it has released music digitally as well as on vinyl, CD, cassette and USB stick. Among a broad range of new and younger artists, Thomas Köner, Porter Ricks and Cristian Vogel have returned to the label. The curatorial focus is centered around the concept of Ultrablackness:"Anonymous, dark, black, hidden, concealed, encrypted, opaque, undercover, incomprehensible: Ultrablack of Music dares the exodus and listens to those forces and sounds that tell of the unheard in music. Sound is the vibration, resonance and diffraction of waves in the black cosmos."Bearing the same title, the book "Ultrablack of Music" contains texts by writers and artists such as Benjamin Noys, Frederic Neyrat, Marcus Schmickler and Holger Schulze. It was accompanied by a compilation of 34 tracks.

Former Sublabels
 Ritornell - started 1999, released rather abstract, sound art works of experimental music
 Cluster - started 2010, released experimental ambient music
 Organic - started 2010, released experimental / progressive, non-electronic (sounding) music
 Force Intel (sister label) - started 2010, released less experimental electronic music, often referred to as IDM

Artists
Some artists released on the label prior to 2004:
 Akufen
 Alva Noto
 Alec Empire
 Andreas Tilliander
 Antye Greie-Fuchs
 Autopoieses (Ekkehard Ehlers and Sebastian Meissner)
 Christophe Charles
 Cristian Vogel
 Curd Duca
 Dälek
 Dean Roberts
 DJ Spooky
 DJ Vadim
 Donnacha Costello
 Frank Bretschneider
 Hanayo
 High Priest of the Antipop Consortium
 Ice
 Jamie Liddell
 Jammin' Unit
 Jetone
 Jim O'Rourke
 Justin Broadrick
 Kevin Martin
 Kid 606
 Kouhei Matsunaga
 Luomo (aka Vladislav Delay)
 Marcus Schmickler
 Marvin Ayres
 Masami Akita
 Max Eastley
 Microstoria
 Mouse On Mars
 Mr. Thing
 Noto
 Oval
 Panacea
 Peter Rehberg
 Porter Ricks
 Random Inc (a.k.a. Sebastian Meissner)
 Robert Babicz
 Ryoji Ikeda
 Safety Scissors
 Scanner
 Si Begg
 snd
 Sophie Rimheden
 Spectre
 Stewart Walker
 Suba
 Suphala
 Techno Animal
 Terre Thaemlitz
 Thomas Köner
 Twerk
 Ultra-red
 Vladislav Delay
 Wolfgang Voigt (best known as Gas)
 Yasunao Tone

Some artists released on the label (or its substitutes) between 2004 and 2010:
 Thomas Köner
 Eight Frozen Modules
 Edith Progue
 Kit Krash
 Ran Slavin
 Bizz Circuits

Some artists released under Marcus Gabler in 2010-2011:
 Ametsub
 Craig Vear
 Gultskra Artikler
 Kabutogani
 Klive
 Wyatt Keusch
Some artists released since the relaunch in 2018:

 Bienoise
 Baransu
 Cristian Vogel
 Deepchild
 Thomas Köner
 Porter Ricks
 Network Ensemble
 Simona Zamboli
 woulg
 DeRayling
 Gianluca Iadema
 John-Robin Bold
 Andy Cowling

See also
 Clicks & Cuts Series
 Glitch (music)
 List of record labels

References

External links
Official website
Mille Plateaux at Bandcamp
Mille Plateaux at Facebook
Mille Plateaux at Instagram
Mille Plateaux page at Discogs
MillePlateauxMedia page at Discogs

German independent record labels
Electronic music record labels
Ambient music record labels
1993 establishments in Germany
Record labels established in 1993
Companies based in Frankfurt